Jeffrey Alan Gossett (born January 25, 1957) is a former American football punter who played in the National Football League (NFL) and the United States Football League (USFL). He played college football at Eastern Illinois University where he was a member of Sigma Pi fraternity.  He was the starting punter for the Los Angeles/Oakland Raiders from 1988 through 1996. During the 1996 season, at age 39, Jeff was the NFL's oldest punter. Gossest had an amazing ability to extend the amount of time his punts stayed in the air (known as "hang time"), which allowed his fellow players to get down the field to converge on the punt returners and/or down balls inside the 20 yard line. He ended his football career after the 1996 season. One of the top punters in the NFL in the 1980s he averaged a career high 44.2 yards per punt in 1991 and earned a spot on the Pro Bowl roster. He also played in the USFL for the Chicago Blitz in 1984 and the Portland Breakers in 1985.

Baseball career
In 1978, Gossett was drafted in the fifth round by the New York Mets and played in their farm system for two seasons as an outfielder and third baseman.

References

External links
 Profile page on NFL.com

1957 births
Living people
American football punters
Eastern Illinois Panthers football players
Kansas City Chiefs players
Cleveland Browns players
Los Angeles Raiders players
Oakland Raiders players
American Conference Pro Bowl players
Chicago Blitz players
Boston/New Orleans/Portland Breakers players
Minor league baseball players
Players of American football from Illinois
People from Charleston, Illinois